Statistics of Swiss Super League in the 1930–31 season.

West

Table

Results

Central

Table

Results

East

Table

Results

Final

Table

Results 

|colspan="3" style="background-color:#D0D0D0" align=center|10 May 1931

|-
|colspan="3" style="background-color:#D0D0D0" align=center|17 May 1931

|-
|colspan="3" style="background-color:#D0D0D0" align=center|31 May 1931

|-
|colspan="3" style="background-color:#D0D0D0" align=center|7 June 1931

|-
|colspan="3" style="background-color:#D0D0D0" align=center|21 June 1931

|-
|colspan="3" style="background-color:#D0D0D0" align=center|28 June 1931

|}

Grasshopper Club Zürich won the championship.

Sources 
 Switzerland 1930-31 at RSSSF

Swiss Serie A seasons
Swiss
1930–31 in Swiss football